Shawn Cheung Siu Lun (born 18 July 1985) is a Hong Kong fencer. He competed in the men's team foil event at the 2020 Summer Olympics.

References

External links
 

1985 births
Living people
Olympic fencers of Hong Kong
Fencers at the 2020 Summer Olympics
Place of birth missing (living people)
Asian Games medalists in fencing
Fencers at the 2010 Asian Games
Fencers at the 2014 Asian Games
Asian Games silver medalists for Hong Kong
Asian Games bronze medalists for Hong Kong
Medalists at the 2010 Asian Games
Medalists at the 2014 Asian Games
Hong Kong male foil fencers
21st-century Hong Kong people